KCCJ-LP (106.9 FM) is a radio station licensed to serve Batesville, Arkansas.  The station is owned by Jubilee Family Church, Inc. It airs a religious radio format.

The station was assigned the KCCJ-LP call letters by the Federal Communications Commission on November 25, 2002.

Ownership
On April 9, 2008, Calvary Chapel of Batesville filed with the FCC to assign the license for KCCJ-LP to The Literacy Council Of Independence County Inc., a ministry of the Jubilee Family Church.  No financial consideration was or will be given for the transfer, in accordance with FCC guidelines.

References

External links
KCCJ-LP official website
 

CCJ-LP
Radio stations established in 2002
2002 establishments in Arkansas
CCJ-LP
Batesville, Arkansas